Clematis chrysocoma, the gold wool clematis, is a flowering vine of the genus Clematis. It has showy flowers like many members of that genus, but it also has a yellow down covering its young branches, leaves, and flower stalks. It is endemic to southern China (W Guizhou, W Sichuan, Yunnan).

Clematis armandii bears clusters of long-stalked 2-inch pinkish white flowers twice each year. It grows to 6–8 feet high and tolerates shade well compared to other varieties of clematis. It is native to western China; in the USA it grows best in American Horticultural Society zones 9 to 6, which are generally found in the southern USA.

References

chrysocoma
Endemic flora of China